Steve Patton  (born December 28, 1953) is a former American football coach  He served as the head football coach at Mars Hill College—now known as Mars Hill University—from 1985 to 1986, at North Greenville University from 1995 to 1996, and at Gardner–Webb University from 1997 to 2010, compiling a career college football coaching record of 117–89–1.

Playing career
Patton played football at the University of Alabama before transferring to Furman University where he also competed in tennis.  He graduated from Furman in 1977.

Coaching career
On December 3, 2010, Gardner–Webb announced it would not be renewing the contract of Patton or his staff.

Head coaching record

College

References

1953 births
Living people
American football defensive ends
Alabama Crimson Tide football players
Furman Paladins football coaches
Furman Paladins football players
Gardner–Webb Runnin' Bulldogs football coaches
Mars Hill Lions football coaches
North Greenville Crusaders football coaches
Charlotte Rage coaches
People from Blount County, Alabama